This is a list of steroidal antiandrogens.

Progesterone derivatives
 11α-Hydroxyprogesterone = 11α-hydroxyprogesterone
 Chlormadinone acetate = 17α-acetoxy-6-chloro-δ6-progesterone
 Clometerone (L-38000) = 6α-chloro-16α-methylprogesterone
 Cyproterone (SH-80881) = 1,2α-methylene-6-chloro-δ6-17α-hydroxyprogesterone
 Cyproterone acetate = 1,2α-methylene-6-chloro-δ6-17α-acetoxyprogesterone
 Edogestrone (PH-218) = 17α-acetoxy-3,3-ethylenedioxy-6-methylpregn-5-en-20-one
 Medrogestone = 6,17α-dimethyl-δ6-progesterone
 Megestrol acetate = 17α-acetoxy-δ6-6-methylprogesterone
 Nomegestrol acetate = 17α-acetoxy-δ6-6-methyl-19-norprogesterone
 Osaterone acetate (TZP-4238) = 17α-acetoxy-6-chloro-2-oxa-δ6-progesterone

Testosterone derivatives
 Abiraterone (CB-7598) = 17-(3-pyridinyl)androsta-5,16-dien-3β-ol
 Abiraterone acetate = 17-(3-pyridinyl)androsta-5,16-dien-3β-ol acetate
 Benorterone (SKF-7690, FC-612) = 17α-methyl-B-nortestosterone
 BOMT (Ro 7-2340) = 6α-bromo-4-oxa-17α-methyl-4,5α-dihydrotestosterone
 Delanterone (GBR-21162) = 17β-dehydroxy-1α-methyl-δ16-testosterone
 Dienogest = 17α-cyanomethyl-19-nor-δ9(10)-testosterone
 Epitestosterone = 17α-epitestosterone
 Galeterone (TOK-001, VN/124-1) = 17-(1H-benzimidazol-1-yl)androsta-5,16-dien-3β-ol
 Metogest (SC-14207) = 16,16-dimethyl-19-nortestosterone
 Mifepristone = 11β-[p-(dimethylamino)phenyl]-17-(1-propynyl)-δ9-19-nortestosterone
 Oxendolone (TSAA-291) = 16β-ethyl-19-nortestosterone
 Rosterolone (SH-434, 17α-propylmesterolone) = 1α-methyl-17α-propyl-4,5α-dihydrotestosterone
 Topterone (WIN-17665) = 17α-propyltestosterone
 Trimethyltrienolone (R-2956, RU-2956) = 2α,2β,17α-trimethyl-19-nor-δ9,11-testosterone	
 Zanoterone (WIN-49596) = (5α,17α)-1'-(methylsulfonyl)-1'-H-pregn-20-yno[3,2-c]pyrazol-17-ol

Spirolactone derivatives

 SC-5233 (spirolactone) = 17α-(2-carboxyethyl)testosterone γ-lactone
 SC-8109 = 19-norspirolactone
 Canrenone (aldadiene) = Δ6-spirolactone
 Dicirenone (SC-26304) = 7α-carboxyisopropylspirolactone
 Drospirenone = 6β,7β:15β,16β-dimethylenespirolactone
 Mespirenone (ZK-94679) = Δ1-7α-acetylthio-15β,16β-methylenespirolactone
 Mexrenone (ZK-32055, SC-25152) = 7α-(methoxycarbonyl)spirolactone
 Prorenone (SC-23133) = 6α,7α-methylenespirolactone
 Spironolactone = 7α-acetylthiospirolactone
 Spirorenone (ZK-35973) = Δ1-6β,7β:15β,16β-dimethylenespirolactone
 Spiroxasone = 7α-acetylthiospirolactone with the ketone group removed from the C17α spirolactone ring

Cortisol derivatives
 9,11-Dehydrocortexolone 17α-butyrate (CB-03-04) = 17α-(butyryloxy)-9,11-didehydrodeoxycorticosterone
 Clascoterone (CB-03-01; cortexolone 17α-propionate, 11-deoxycortisol 17α-propionate) = 17α-(propionyloxy)deoxycorticosterone

Others
 Guggulsterone = pregna-4,17-diene-3,16-dione
 Nordinone = 11α-hydroxy-17,17-dimethyl-18-norandrosta-4,13-dien-3-one

See also
 List of steroids

Antiandrogens
Steroids
Steroidal antiandrogens